Wagensteigbach is a river of Baden-Württemberg, Germany. At its confluence with the Rotbach near Kirchzarten, the Dreisam is formed.

See also
List of rivers of Baden-Württemberg

References

Rivers of Baden-Württemberg
Rivers of Germany